Eumolpus is a genus of leaf beetles in the subfamily Eumolpinae. It includes 40 species, most of which have a large size and include some of the largest members of the subfamily. They are distributed throughout the Neotropical realm, though one species (Eumolpus robustus) has been recorded as far north as Arizona (in the United States), and the genus is not found in the Caribbean.

Etymology
The name of the genus is either derived from the Ancient Greek  (eúmolpos), or is named after Eumolpus from Greek mythology, who was the son of Poseidon and Chione.

Taxonomic history
The genus in its current sense is attributed to Weber, 1801. However, the name Eumolpus was first used in Johann Karl Wilhelm Illiger's Verzeichniß der Käfer Preußens in 1798, where it was attributed to Johann Gottlieb Kugelann, and originally consisted of European species now placed in the genera Chrysochus and Bromius.

While most authors followed Weber, 1801, some recent European entomologists have followed Warchałowski, who synonymised Chrysochus with Eumolpus in 1993, designating Chrysomela praetiosa as the type species of Eumolpus. This designation by Warchałowski was invalid, since Latreille had designated Cryptocephalus vitis as the type species of Eumolpus in 1810, which placed Bromius in synonymy with Eumolpus. This threatened stability for Eumolpus, Bromius and Chrysochus.

In 2010, an application was made to the International Commission on Zoological Nomenclature to conserve the names Eumolpus Weber, 1801, Chrysochus Chevrolat in Dejean, 1836 and Bromius Chevrolat in Dejean, 1836 by suppressing the name Eumolpus Illiger, 1798, and to set aside all type species designations for Eumolpus before Hope's designation of Chrysomela ignita Fabricius, 1787 in 1840. This was accepted by the ICZN in 2012.

Gallery

Species
The following species are described in Eumolpus:

 Eumolpus alutaceus Germar, 1824
 Eumolpus antonius Špringlová, 1960
 Eumolpus ardens Špringlová, 1960
 Eumolpus australis Baly, 1877
 Eumolpus bucki Špringlová, 1960
 Eumolpus caesareus Špringlová, 1960
 Eumolpus caryophorus Špringlová, 1960
 Eumolpus clavipalpus (Chapuis, 1874)
 Eumolpus clavipalpus clavipalpus (Chapuis, 1874)
 Eumolpus clavipalpus sigmulus Špringlová, 1960
 Eumolpus corrientinus Špringlová, 1960
 Eumolpus corrientinus corrientinus Špringlová, 1960
 Eumolpus corrientinus humeralis Špringlová, 1960
 Eumolpus cupreus Olivier, 1808
 Eumolpus cupreus cupreus Olivier, 1808
 Eumolpus cupreus paulus Špringlová, 1960
 Eumolpus cyaneus (Sulzer, 1776)
 Eumolpus divisus Špringlová, 1960
 Eumolpus divisus divisus Špringlová, 1960
 Eumolpus divisus laevipleurus Špringlová, 1960
 Eumolpus divisus ludicrus Špringlová, 1960
 Eumolpus divisus purpurascens Špringlová, 1960
 Eumolpus divisus recticollis Špringlová, 1960
 Eumolpus episternalis Špringlová, 1960
 Eumolpus franciscus Špringlová, 1960
 Eumolpus franciscus fortis Špringlová, 1960
 Eumolpus franciscus fortissimus Špringlová, 1960
 Eumolpus franciscus franciscus Špringlová, 1960
 Eumolpus fulgidus Weber, 1801
 Eumolpus gigas (Herbst, 1784)
 Eumolpus glaberrimus (Gmelin, 1788)
 Eumolpus glaberrimus glaberrimus (Gmelin, 1788)
 Eumolpus glaberrimus tapajosensis Špringlová, 1960
 Eumolpus glaberrimus tinctipes Špringlová, 1960
 Eumolpus ignitus (Fabricius, 1787)
 Eumolpus incisellus Špringlová, 1960
 Eumolpus insulatus Špringlová, 1960
 Eumolpus itataiensis Špringlová, 1960
 Eumolpus itataiensis itataiensis Špringlová, 1960
 Eumolpus itataiensis planicollis Špringlová, 1960
 Eumolpus janus Špringlová, 1960
 Eumolpus mauliki Papp, 1952
 Eumolpus minutus Špringlová, 1960
 Eumolpus minutus aureolus Špringlová, 1960
 Eumolpus minutus minutus Špringlová, 1960
 Eumolpus nitidus Baly, 1877
 Eumolpus nitidus facilis Špringlová, 1960
 Eumolpus nitidus nitidus Baly, 1877
 Eumolpus olivieri Clavareau, 1914
 Eumolpus opacus Špringlová, 1960
 Eumolpus opacus ablatus Špringlová, 1960
 Eumolpus opacus grandis Špringlová, 1960
 Eumolpus opacus opacus Špringlová, 1960
 Eumolpus oppositus Špringlová, 1960
 Eumolpus oreinoides Špringlová, 1960
 Eumolpus palpalis Špringlová, 1960
 Eumolpus pereirai Špringlová, 1960
 Eumolpus polychromus Špringlová, 1960
 Eumolpus robustus (Horn, 1885) 
 Eumolpus separatus Baly, 1877
 Eumolpus sigmus Špringlová, 1960
 Eumolpus sophiae Kolbe, 1901
 Eumolpus surinamensis (Fabricius, 1775)
 Eumolpus surinamensis forcipatus Špringlová, 1960
 Eumolpus surinamensis maracayus Špringlová, 1960
 Eumolpus surinamensis surinamensis (Fabricius, 1775)
 Eumolpus surinamensis viridanus Špringlová, 1960
 Eumolpus tafti Špringlová, 1960
 Eumolpus truncatus Špringlová, 1960
 Eumolpus viriditarsis Špringlová, 1960
 Eumolpus viriditarsis crassus Špringlová, 1960
 Eumolpus viriditarsis panamae Špringlová, 1960
 Eumolpus viriditarsis pebasus Špringlová, 1960
 Eumolpus viriditarsis rudis Špringlová, 1960
 Eumolpus viriditarsis scintillans Špringlová, 1960
 Eumolpus viriditarsis viriditarsis Špringlová, 1960

Unpublished species(?):
 Eumolpus candens Germar

Species now placed in Longeumolpus:
 Eumolpus carinatus Baly, 1877
 Eumolpus imperialis Baly, 1877
 Eumolpus prasinus Erichson, 1847
 Eumolpus speciosus Baly, 1877
 Eumolpus subcostatus (Lefèvre, 1885)

References

Chrysomelidae genera
Eumolpinae
Beetles of North America
Beetles of South America